Saint-Mont is a commune in the Gers department in southwestern France.

Geography

Population

Saint-Mont wine
Wines are produced under the VDQS designation Saint-Mont and the area's vineyards are part of the South West France wine region. This VDQS, created in 1981, was previously called Côtes de Saint-Mont, before the name was changed in 2007. In 2011, following the abolition of the VDQS system, the wine was granted AOP status.

The vineyards have a surface of 1200 hectares, the VDQS designation is only valid for delimited vineyards where red, rosé and white wines are produced.

For red and rosé wines: Tannat, Fer, Cabernet Sauvignon, Merlot, Cabernet Franc.
For white wine: Arrufiac, Gros Manseng, Petit Manseng, Courbu, Clairette Blanche.

The soil is mainly siliceous earth, clay and sand.

See also
Communes of the Gers department
French wine

References

Communes of Gers